The 2000 Skate America was the first event of six in the 2000–01 ISU Grand Prix of Figure Skating, a senior-level international invitational competition series. It was held at the World Arena in Colorado Springs, Colorado on October 26–29. Medals were awarded in the disciplines of men's singles, ladies' singles, pair skating, and ice dancing. Skaters earned points toward qualifying for the 2000–01 Grand Prix Final. The compulsory dance was the Westminster Waltz.

Results

Men
Guo Zhengxin was assigned to Skate America but did not compete.

Ladies

Pairs

Ice dancing

References

Skate America, 2000
Skate America